The Hawker P.1072 was a 1949 experimental British aircraft acting as a test bed for the Armstrong Siddeley Snarler rocket booster engine. It was the prototype Hawker Sea Hawk modified to install the rocket in the tail.

Development
After the Second World War Hawker was working on a new fighter under their internal designation P.1040 which later became the Hawker Sea Hawk.

Armstrong Siddeley had begun work in 1946 to develop a liquid-fuelled rocket motor (to be used as a booster unit for fighters) for the Ministry of Supply. To investigate the feasibility of rocket-powered fighter aircraft, the original Sea Hawk prototype, VP401, was  converted into a test bed for the Armstrong Siddeley Snarler rocket motor, in addition to its normal Rolls-Royce Nene turbojet, becoming the P.1072. The P.1040 had a split exhaust which gave space in the tail free for the installation of the rocket.

The Snarler was pump fed rather than by pressurization of the fuel tanks. The installation of the rocket motor required considerable reinforcement of the fuselage as well as completely revised pneumatic and fuel systems. Jet engine fuel capacity was reduced from 395 gal (1,520 L) to 175 gal (675 L) and two tanks for rocket fuel were installed. The cylindrical liquid oxygen tank in the forward fuselage had a capacity of 75 gal (288 L), and the water-methanol tank in the rear fuselage had a capacity of 120 gal (460 L). External differences were limited to a slight bulge in the rear fuselage under the rudder and a fairing on the bottom centerline of the fuselage, covering piping between the tanks and the rocket motor in the tail.

The Rolls-Royce Nene 103 with 5,180 lbf (23.1 kN) of thrust was used for the ferry flights and for takeoff and initial climb. The Snarler rocket which  developed 2,000 lbf (8.9 kN) of thrust was first used in flight on 20 November 1950. There were limitations on the six flights were made using the rocket motor before a minor explosion damaged the aircraft. Soon after, the British government decided that turbojets with reheat (afterburner) would be used instead of rocket power.

Specifications (P.1072)

See also

Notes

References

 Hannah, Donald. Hawker FlyPast Reference Library. Stamford, Lincolnshire, UK: Key Publishing Ltd., 1982. .
 James, Derek N. Hawker, an Aircraft Album No. 5. New York: Arco Publishing Company, 1973. . (First published in the UK by Ian Allan in 1972)
 Mason, Francis K. Hawker Aircraft since 1920. London: Putnam, 1991.

1950s British experimental aircraft
P1072
Mixed-power aircraft
Rocket-powered aircraft